Broadway Ferry was a ferry landing in Williamsburg, Brooklyn, New York City, United States at the foot of Broadway. Boats connected it to the Grand Street Ferry, East 23rd Street Ferry, and James Slip landings in Manhattan. In Brooklyn, the Broadway El ended at the ferry.

See also
List of ferries across the East River
NY Waterway

References

Transportation buildings and structures in Brooklyn
East River
Ferries of New York City